Arıklı is a village in Tarsus district  of Mersin Province, Turkey,  at . It is situated in the Çukurova (Cilicia) plains. It is on the state highway , east of Mersin,  Tarsus and Yenice. It is the easternmost village of the province. The population of the village  is 278  as of 2012.

References

Villages in Tarsus District